Resta is a surname. Notable people with the surname include:

Anthony J. Resta, Canadian record producer and musician
Dario Resta (1882–1924), Italian British race car driver

See also
DiResta (surname)